The 98th Flying Training Squadron is a United States Air Force unit assigned to the Air Education and Training Command 306th Flying Training Group.  It is stationed at the United States Air Force Academy, Colorado, however the current UV-18 B Twin Otter aircraft are housed and maintained at nearby Peterson Air Force Base, Colorado.

The mission of the 98th is to provide parachute training to cadets.  The basic program trains 1,200 students per year with the majority of positions given to USAF Academy cadets. ROTC cadets are assigned positions on an availability and timing basis.

Overview
In 1995, the 98th Flying Training Squadron was reactivated as a parachute training squadron at the United States Air Force Academy. With Air Staff approval to teach military parachuting, the parachute Branch under the Airmanship Division of the AFA was born in the Spring of 1966. In 1982, parachuting became a flight under the 94th ATS. In 1995, the Parachute Flight grew too large and was designated the 98th FTS.

What started as a club training 25 students a year has grown into a premier character development program training 600 to 1,200 cadets annually and field nationally recognized competition and demonstration teams.

The basic AM-490 program, which was using round parachutes since its conception, evolved with the use of modern piggy back container systems and square parachutes for both the main and reserve. Each student is equipped with a radio so all landings can be assisted from the ground. The basic program trains 1,200 students per year with the majority of positions given to USAF Academy cadets. ROTC cadets are assigned positions on an availability and timing basis.

Training Overview
The Wings of Blue (sometimes known as PTWOBs, and stands for "Parachute Team – Wings of Blue"), is the parachuting unit at the United States Air Force Academy, near Colorado Springs, Colorado. The team operates as the 98th Flying Training Squadron, 306th Flying Training Group, Air Education and Training Command.

Over the last several decades, the Wings of Blue has been one of the outstanding parachute units in the United States. Since 1967, cadets have dominated national intercollegiate parachuting, winning 21 national championships.  They perform about 50 demonstrations each year, and have shown off their skills at the BCS National Championship, Orange Bowl, Copper Bowl, Fiesta Bowl, and Pro Bowl and most Air Force Falcons football games. The team travels locally, nationally, and internationally to perform in air shows and competitions. Their stated mission is to: "Develop airmen through flight in its purest form—STAND IN THE DOOR!"

Training history
Parachuting at the U.S. Air Force Academy began in 1964 when a group of ambitious cadets took to the skies. The activity, at the time, was off-limits to cadets.  Knowing full well the consequences if caught participating, their involvements were nonetheless revealed through their own irrepressible success.  That spring, Cadet First Class (senior) Jay Kelley and Cadet Third Class (sophomore) Pete Johnston paired and won a novice team accuracy event—the Academy's first gold medal in collegiate competition.  Their achievements that day resulted in an invitational demonstration at the Pueblo Army Depot, after which the commander at Fort Carson sent a very nice letter to the Academy's superintendent, thanking him for allowing the fine young men of his skydiving team to participate".  After a thorough investigation, the Commandant of Cadets, Brigadier General Robert W. Strong Jr. "had a dilemma on his hands.  After all, balancing against the weight of these young men's sin was the positive publicity they had brought upon themselves and the Academy.  However illegal their activities, they were on to something good".

Each year since then, more than 800 cadets, officers, and enlisted members, from both U.S. and foreign services, complete five free fall jumps and earn their parachutist badge and rating.  The Air Force Academy offers the only jump program in the world authorized to allow students to perform unassisted free fall delays on their first jump without any prior jump experience. Although parachutist wings are awarded, they are non-operational in any Department of Defense unit; to be in an airborne operational unit or functioned job, personnel must complete the United States Army Airborne School in Ft. Benning, Georgia.

Training programs

Airmanship 490
Airmanship 490 (AM-490) is the basic free fall course instructed by members of the Wings of Blue. Students enrolled in the course undergo more than 30 hours of ground training prior to their first free fall jump. The rigorous ground training introduces and develops procedures and techniques for high altitude free fall, and for operating a steerable parachute system.  The course focuses on safety and emergency procedures to aid the students' ability to overcome their fears and perform under the extremely stressful and potentially life-threatening situations they may encounter.

Prior to each of the five jumps, students in the AM-490 class receive two gear inspections prior to boarding the aircraft to ensure their parachutes are fitted and working properly.  These thorough inspections guarantee that the parachute's main and reserve canopy firing devices are on and accurately calibrated, and their gear is not defective.  Students also receive a comprehensive briefing from the jumpmaster before loading the aircraft.  Once airborne, the jumpmaster determines the exit/opening point, which varies with the day's wind patterns, student's receive their third and final gear inspection as the plane turns inbound for the jump run.  At 4,500 feet above ground level (AGL), winds rush into the fuselage as the jumpmaster opens the door then instructs the first jumper to: "STAND IN THE DOOR!"

Airmanship 491
Before the Fall semester begins, 25 cadets entering their second year at the Academy are hand-selected from approximately 200 applicants for an upgrade program into the Wings of Blue, known informally as the "Wings of Green."  In their first semester in AM-491, cadets undergo Accelerated Freefall training and receive their USPA A license. In the Spring semester, students complete the rigorous training to become jumpmasters and instruct an AM-490 class under the supervision of senior cadets on the Wings of Blue.  After a year of training, the Wings of Green graduate onto the Wings of Blue and are recognized not only as AM-490 instructors, but qualified aircrew members for the 98th Flying Training Squadron operations.

Airmanship 496
Airmanship 496 (AM-496) is composed of the junior and senior Wings of Blue members. This group is divided into the junior competition/demonstration team, and the senior competition/demonstration team.  While cadets in AM-496 dedicate themselves to the demands of their individual teams, they remain united in their performance of duties within the squadron, team dynamics, and stay steadfast to their core mission as Airmanship 490 instructors and jumpmasters.

Both the Junior and Senior competition teams are composed of approximately ten members: two four-way teams, and one two-member team performing vertical relative work, also known as freefly.  All 20 members compete in canopy accuracy as well.  In the aerial events, teams are given 35 to 40 seconds to complete a preplanned formation maneuvers after exiting the plane.  Jumpers exit with a videographer who records the jump for judging.  The competition team represents the Wings of Blue at numerous competitions across the country, to include the National Skydiving Championships, National Collegiate Parachuting Championships, Black and Gold Competition (an all military competition), and numerous other free fall and accuracy meets throughout the year.  The comp team fares well in all these meets, winning medals at many of the meets they attend.  To date, the PTWOB competition team has been recognized as the leading collegiate team in the nation 29 of the last 39 years.

The demonstration team is composed of the remaining team members in the AM-496 program.  This team represents the Wings of Blue around the nation at Air Force forums, air shows, football games, and various other sporting events, and at other civilian requests.  The demo team puts on quite a show for crowds all across the United States, as well in other countries.  Their act is composed of relative work consisting of colored smoke jumping, and flag/streamer presentations.  The demo team is also well known for its appearance at major college football bowl games during the holiday season, as well as Monday Night Football games.

History

World War II

The 98th Flying Training Squadron has its origins in 1941, being initially organized with Douglas B-18 Bolos in Hawaii with a mission to perform defensive reconnaissance over the Pacific approaches to the islands.  After the Attack on Pearl Harbor, performed search and rescue and antisubmarine patrols.  Re-equipped with Boeing B-17E Flying Fortresses and sent to South Pacific, engaging in long-range bombardment missions against Japanese forces in the Solomon Islands campaign.  Re-equipped with long-range Consolidated B-24 Liberators when the Flying Fortresses were reassigned to support British forces in Egypt.  Engaged in combat operations in Central and South Pacific areas, also supported the liberation of the Philippines and seizure of Okinawa.  Carried out attacks from Okinawa over China and Formosa until the end the war in the Pacific.

Awarded Distinguished Unit Unit Citation: South Pacific, 31 July-30 November 1942. Presidential Unit Citation: [1942] for actions in the Papua New Guinea and Guadalcanal campaigns.

Re-equipped with Boeing B-29 Superfortresses in 1946; became part of Far East Air Forces; non-operational, 1947–1948.

Strategic Air Command
Activated at Carswell Air Force Base, Texas in 1949 and became a Convair B-36 Peacemaker strategic bombardment squadron.

In 1959 was reassigned to SAC's 4123d Strategic Wing, being re-equipped with Boeing B-52E Stratofortress intercontinental heavy bombers.  Moved to Clinton-Sherman Air Force Base, Oklahoma by SAC to disperse its heavy bomber force.  Conducted worldwide strategic bombardment training missions and providing nuclear deterrent.  Was inactivated in 1963 when SAC inactivated its strategic wings, replacing them with permanent Air Force controlled wings.  Squadron was inactivated with aircraft/personnel/equipment being transferred to the 6th Bombardment Squadron, which was simultaneously activated.

Pilot training
The squadron was reactivated in 1988 as an undergraduate pilot training squadron at Williams Air Force Base, Arizona, and equipped with the Cessna T-37 Tweet.  It was inactivated in 1992 with the closure of Williams.

Lineage
 Constituted as the 98th Bombardment Squadron (Heavy) on 2 December 1941
 Activated on 16 December 1941
 Redesignated 98th Bombardment Squadron, Very Heavy on 30 April 1946
 Redesignated 98th Bombardment Squadron, Heavy on 25 June 1943
 Inactivated on 20 October 1948
 Redesignated 98th Bombardment Squadron, Heavy and activated on 1 December 1948
 Discontinued and inactivated on 1 February 1963
 Redesignated 98th Flying Training Squadron on 29 April 1988
 Activated on 1 June 1988
 Inactivated on 26 June 1992
 Reactivated on 31 October 1994

Assignments
 11th Bombardment Group, 16 December 1941 – 20 October 1948
 11th Bombardment Group, 1 December 1948 (attached to 11th Bombardment Wing after 16 February 1951)
 11th Bombardment Wing, 16 June 1952 
 4123d Strategic Wing, 10 December 1957 – 1 February 1963
 82d Flying Training Wing, 1 June 1988
 82d Operations Group, 15 December 1991 – 26 June 1992
 34th Operations Group, 31 October 1994 – 1 October 2004
 306th Flying Training Group, 1 October 2004 – present

Stations

 Hickam Field, Hawaii, 16 December 1941
 Luganville Airfield, Espiritu Santo, New Hebrides, 11 August 1942
 Operated from Plaine Des Gaiacs Airfield, New Caledonia, 21 July-11 August 1942, Henderson Field, Guadalcanal, November 1942
 Mokuleia Airfield, Hawaii, 8 April 1943
 Nukufetau Airfield, Nukufetau, Gilbert and Ellice Islands, 11 November 1943
 Hawkins Field (Tarawa), 20 January 1944
 Kwajalein Airfield, Kwajalein, Marshall Islands, 3 April 1944

 Agana Airfield, Guam, 21 October 1944
 Kadena Airfield, Okinawa 2 July 1945
 Fort William McKinley, Luzon, Philippines, 1948
 Carswell Air Force Base, Texas, 1 December 1948
 Deployed to: RAF Brize Norton, England, 27 June–7 July 1952
 Deployed to: Nouasseur Air Base, French Morocco; 6–14 April, 30 June–29 July 1954, 2–9 May 1955, 15–27 February and October 1956
 Clinton-Sherman Air Force Base, Oklahoma, 1 March 1959 – 1 February 1963
 Williams Air Force Base, Arizona, 1 June 1988 – 26 June 1992
 United States Air Force Academy, Colorado, 31 October 1994 – present

Aircraft

 Douglas B-18 Bolo, 1942
 Boeing B-17 Flying Fortress, 1942–1943
 Consolidated B-24 Liberator, 1943–1945
 Boeing B-29 Superfortress, 1946.
 Convair B-36 Peacemaker, 1949–1957
 Boeing B-52 Stratofortress, 1958–1963
 Cessna T-37 Tweet, 1988–1992
 DeHavilland Canada UV-18B Twin Otter, 1994–present

See also

 List of B-52 Units of the United States Air Force

References

Notes
 Explanatory Notes

 Citations

Bibliography

External links
 98th FTS at AETC
 98th FTS History Factsheet

United States Air Force Academy
Parachuting in the United States
Military units and formations in Colorado
0098